Marko Tarabochia (born 28 November 1988) is a Croatian-born Bosnian handball player for Dabas KK and the Bosnian national team.

References

1988 births
Living people
Bosnia and Herzegovina male handball players
Wisła Płock (handball) players